John Abbotts (10 October 1924 – 10 February 2008) was an English footballer.

Career
Abbotts played for Meakin's and Ravenscliffe before joining Port Vale in May 1949. He made his debut at right-back in a 2–1 defeat at Newport County on 31 August 1950 and played two further games later in the season, but was not selected again and was released in May 1953.

Career statistics
Source:

References

1924 births
2008 deaths
Footballers from Stoke-on-Trent
English footballers
Association football defenders
Port Vale F.C. players
English Football League players